The Mediterranean Beach Games is a multi-sport event organized by the International Committee of Mediterranean Games (CIJM) since 2015.

The CIJM formed the games in a meeting on October 20, 2012 in Mersin, Turkey, and decided on a format of every 4 years starting from 2015. The Games consist only water sports and beach sports, which aim at bringing together young athletes of the Mediterranean area, giving them the opportunity to participate in sport events.

History
Pescara, Italy was awarded the rights to host the first edition of the Mediterranean Beach Games from 28 August to 6 September. The sports included in the program of the 1st Mediterranean Beach Games are the following: Aquathlon, Beach Handball, Beach Soccer, Beach Tennis, Beach Volley, Beach Wrestling, Finswimming, Canoe Ocean Racing, Open Water Swimming, Rowing Beach Sprint, Water Ski.

Patras, Greece hosted the 2019 games, and in October, 2021, Heraklion, Greece signed a contract to host the 2023 games.

Events

All-time medal table 2015–2019

See also
 International Committee of Mediterranean Games
 Mediterranean Athletics U23 Championships

References

External links 
International Mediterranean Games Committee
Mediterranean Games Athletic results at gbrathletics website
Dubrovnik, Mostar and Kotor joint application for 2021 Games, Croatian newspapers Slobodna Dalmacija
Dubrovnik, Mostar and Kotor joint application for 2021 Games, Bosnian-Herzegovian newspapers
Mersin XVII Mediterranean Games

 
Beach
Recurring sporting events established in 2015
Quadrennial sporting events
Multi-sport events
Games
Beach sports competitions